HRJ may refer to:
 Hardy–Ramanujan Journal
 Harnett Regional Jetport, in North Carolina, United States